Janice M. Vidal (born 13 April 1982) is a Hong Kong Cantopop singer and actress. Vidal was first discovered by music producer Mark Lui and initially began her career as a back-up singer for Leon Lai. She debuted as a solo artist in 2004 under Lai's label, Amusic, where she remained until signing with Warner Music in 2015.

She is of mixed Filipino, Chinese, and Korean descent and the twin sister of singer Jill Vidal.

Biography
Vidal was born in Kowloon, Hong Kong to a Filipino father and mother of mixed Chinese and Korean descent. She worked as a bar singer under the name "Renee" and joined the 2000 New Talent Singing Awards as Ming Lok Tai (明樂蒂) before adopting her current Chinese name, Wai Lan (衛蘭).

Vidal admitted in a radio interview that she cannot read Chinese and uses Romanization to help her pronounce words that she sings in the recording studio.

In an interview with South China Morning Post in 2009, she stated that she had converted to Buddhism about 6 years prior. Vidal has since converted to Christianity together with her sister Jill.

Music career
In her first concert, Vidal stated that she was signed by Amusic around 2003.  At the time Leon Lai thought that her Cantonese was not good enough, and initially asked her to work as an office assistant.

During the winter of 2004, Vidal started catching the media's attention by covering one of Lai's classic hits, "Long Distance" (情深說話未曾講) in English. The cover song quickly became a hit. Some fans initially thought it was an overseas singer who was covering one of Lai's classic hits, but were surprised to find out the singer was an unknown Hong Kong rookie. Since it was Christmas, her first song was swiftly followed by a Christmas version of another Lai song, "Bu Ke Yi Shi" (不可一世), sung in Cantonese. The Cantonese cover of "Long Distance" (情深說話未曾講) was aired on radio in Spring 2005 for the first time.

By April 2005, Vidal had become known as a mysterious singer who sang several cover versions of Leon Lai's songs, but whose face had never been seen in public. After roughly six months of radio publicity and building public anticipation, her face was finally unveiled when her debut album "Day & Night" was released on 13 April 2005. Fellow Cantopop singer, Justin Lo, was one of the main producers for this album, and it soon became a hit. On 25 November 2005, Vidal released her second album, "My Love".

Vidal won all the (female) newbie singer awards in 2005 that were awarded by the Hong Kong media. They were Commercial Radio Hong Kong (CRHK) 2005 Best Female Newbies – Gold, RTHK 2005 Best Female Newbies – Gold, TVB 2005 Best Female Newbies – Gold and Metro Radio I-Tech Metro Best Newbies 2005 (unranked). In mid-December 2005, she placed fifth for Commercial Radio 2's 2005 Favorite Female Singer Award. She won bronze in the Best Female singer category for 2006.

Vidal held her first concert series in Hong Kong from 29 March to 1 April 2007, as part of her four-night stint at the Hong Kong Coliseum. It was called "My First Concert."

Vidal's fourth studio album, titled Serving You, was released on 27 November 2008. On 21 December during the press conference for Lai's new album Is Me, Lai announced that Serving You had sold more than 150,000 units.

Vidal's fifth studio album, titled Morning, was released on 3 July 2009 and is her first English album consisting entirely of original compositions.

From 28 April 2007 to 13 May 2007 Madame Tussauds Hong Kong organised the "Madame Tussauds – Your Celebrity Choice for this Summer" competition with an aim to select a new wax portrayal to be displayed in the Madame Tussauds museum. Vidal won the competition in May and her wax portrayal went on display in the glamour section on 18 July 2007. The statue is dressed in a green ballet dress worn during "My First Concert", which Vidal had donated.

Janice Vidal released her Greatest Hits Selection + New Songs compilation disc on 27 November 2009, which comprises hit songs from her 5-year singing career and features 34 songs and 17 Music Videos.

In April 2010, Janice won the highest record sales award (female artist) at the 2009 Hong Kong IFPI Awards ceremony.  In addition, her albums Serving You and Wish were also listed among the top 10 best-selling Cantonese albums of 2009.

Janice released her new Cantonese album called Love Diaries before her second concert, "Fairy Concert 2010", at the Hong Kong Coliseum on the 16 and 17 October.  She also held her first MOOV live concert on 11 July 2010, where she performed five new songs from her new album as well as older classics with new arrangements.  The song "What Men Believe" (男人信甚麼), with JW, won her Best Song of the Year at the TVB 2010 Jade Solid Gold Music Awards.

Discography

Studio albums

Live releases
 2010 – Fairy Concert 2010 (2 DVD + 2 Audio CD) (6 December 2010)
 2010 – Fairy Concert 2010 (Blu-Ray) (2 Blu-ray Disc) (30 December 2010)
 2010 – Fairy Concert 2010 (2nd Version) (2 DVD) (30 December 2010)
 2012 – 3000 Day and Night Concert 2012 (2 Audio CD) (17 August 2012)

Filmography

Concerts

Awards

References

External links

 

1982 births
Living people
English-language singers from Hong Kong
Cantonese-language singers
Mandarin-language singers
French-language singers
Japanese-language singers
Tagalog-language singers
Hong Kong people of Filipino descent
Hong Kong people of Korean descent
Hong Kong Christians
21st-century Hong Kong women singers
Hong Kong film actresses
Hong Kong television actresses
Hong Kong twins
Actresses of Filipino descent
Actresses of Korean descent
Warner Music Hong Kong artists